Evarcha rotundibulbis is a jumping spider species in the genus Evarcha that lives in Ethiopia.

References

Endemic fauna of Ethiopia
Salticidae
Fauna of Ethiopia
Spiders of Africa
Spiders described in 2008
Taxa named by Wanda Wesołowska